Mnohaya lita (literally "Many Years" or the implied meaning "wishing you many years of life") is a traditional Ukrainian celebratory song. The song is based on both the  Eis polla etē ("Many Years to You") and on the Byzantine Rite polychronion (from the  mŭnogaja lěta) or the hierarchical acclamation Ton Despotin, which is normally sung at the end of church services. The song is also sung at informal gatherings (such as birthdays or name days) and at formal events, such as weddings, church events or other celebrations.

Many variations of the melody are in use, but the lyrics in most cases stay the same (i.e., repeating Mnohaya lita). It remains an integral part of Ukrainian diaspora culture long after assimilation.

Similar songs

The song serves the same function as "Happy Birthday To You" or "For He's a Jolly Good Fellow". As a secular song, its message is similar to that of the Polish "Sto lat" ("One Hundred Years") and is traditionally sung to a person to express wishes of good health and long life.

Lyrics
Traditional lyrics repeat the same words:

Alternative lyrics include a more religious undertone:

Use as a phrase
The phrase "Mnohaya lita" is sometimes accompanied with Благая / "Blahaya" ("Blessed").  For example, when a priest says, "... Mnohaya i blahaya lita," the congregation sings in response, "Mnohaya lita".

When celebrating someone's birthday, you could say "Mnohaya lita" to them (equivalent to saying "Happy Birthday" in English).

References

Ukrainian folk songs
Ukrainian traditions
Wedding songs
Songs about birthday parties
Songs about birthdays